The March 73A was an open-wheel formula racing car, designed, developed, and built by British manufacturer and constructor, March Engineering, for Formula 5000 racing, between 1973 and 1974. It competed in both the European and SCCA U.S. F5000 championships. It also competed in one non-championship Formula One World Championship Grand Prix; the 1973 Race of Champions. It was later converted into a closed-wheel Can-Am-style prototype chassis, where it competed in the 1984 championship.

References

March vehicles
Formula 5000 cars
Sports prototypes